p-hydroxybenzoate hydroxylase may refer to:

 Benzoate 4-monooxygenase
 4-hydroxybenzoate 3-monooxygenase